Juliana Dever (born December 17, 1980) is an American actress and travel blogger. Dever is best known for her recurring role on crime drama Castle as Jennifer "Jenny" Ryan. In 2016, Dever produced and starred in the VR web series Touched By Destiny.

Personal life
Dever was born and raised in St. Louis, Missouri, on December 17, 1980. She trained as an actor at the Moscow Art Theatre in Russia. She is married to actor Seamus Dever, with whom she starred on Castle as his on-screen wife, Jenny Ryan. They married in 2006.

Dever and her husband are vegetarians. Both are also supporters of Best Friends Animal Society.

Filmography

Film

Television

Video

References

External links
 
 
 Official travel blog : Clever Dever Wherever

Living people
Actresses from St. Louis
1980 births
21st-century American women